Aaranji Poika is a landlocked natural lake formation above the montane hills. It is located at Kudappanakunnu in the middle of Thiruvananthapuram in the Indian state of Kerala,

At one time, this lake reached 20 to 30 feet in depth and its catchment area had thick forest coverage, covering more than twenty acres of land. It was a source of perennial water flow that nourished the ponds, wells and streams of surrounding areas of the hill for 5 to 10 km, reaching the majority of Thiruvananthapuram.

Development 

This water body is now reduced to small patches in its original bed due to the removal of the hill on the northern side to drain the lake. The lake is to be replaced with construction.

The forest on two shores and the closed campuses of organizations that came during recent years on other two sides provided cover for this destruction. An unauthorized road was constructed on the northern side to bring in machinery and remove sand and earth. Artificial tanks are to be installed for processing coir with chemicals, for establishing a waste processing unit and a plastic shredding facility.

Experts and newspaper reports opine that the deterioration of the health of  population in an 8-mile radius resulting from this pollution will be faster and visible than at any other place. The dirt will move fast through earlier natural channels under earth that nourished the ponds, wells and streams of the region.

References

Lakes of Kerala
Geography of Thiruvananthapuram